Leslie Arthur "Lou" Gare (16 June 1939 – 6 October 2017) was a British free-jazz saxophonist born in Rugby, Warwickshire, England, perhaps best known for his works with the improvised music ensemble AMM and playing with musicians such as Eddie Prévost, Mike Westbrook, Cornelius Cardew, Keith Rowe and Sam Richards.

Discography

With AMM
At the Roundhouse (Anomalous)
AMM Group of London (Mainstream)
To Hear And Back Again (Matchless)
Cornelius Cardew Memorial Concert (Impetus)
The Crypt - 12 June 1968 (Matchless)
"The Aarhus Sequences", disc one of LAMINAL, a three CD retrospective AMM set (Matchless)

Other than with AMM
Saxophony Horn-Bill, reed solos compilation 2005 (incl. John Butcher, Natahaniel Catchpole, Kai Fagasschinski, Evan Parker and Seymour Wright) (Matchless)
No Strings Attached, solo saxophone 2005 (Matchless)

References

Bibliography
 *Carr, Ian; Fairweather, Digby; Priestley, Brian, "Jazz: The Rough Guide" (1995), Penguin, .

1939 births
2017 deaths
Jazz tenor saxophonists
American jazz saxophonists
American male saxophonists
English jazz saxophonists
British male saxophonists
American male jazz musicians
20th-century American saxophonists
People from Rugby, Warwickshire